The Complete Nebula Award-Winning Fiction is a 1986 collection of short stories and novellas by American writer Samuel R. Delany. The collection includes those works by Delany that have won the Nebula Award.

Contents
 "Babel-17"
 "A Fabulous, Formless Darkness"
 "Aye, and Gomorrah..."
 "Time Considered as a Helix of Semi-Precious Stones"
 Forward to an Afterword
 Afterword: A Fictional Architecture that Manages Only with Great Difficulty Not Once to Mention Harlan Ellison

Sources

1986 short story collections
Fantasy short story collections
Science fiction short story collections
Short story collections by Samuel Delany